Kipiani is a Georgian noble family, formerly a princely one (tavadi or house dates as back as the 7th century). "Kipi"(Georgian: ყიფი) means proud.

Notable ones :

 David Kipiani (1951–2001), Soviet and Georgian footballer and coach
 Dimitri Kipiani (1814–1887), Georgian publicist, writer, translator, leader of liberal nobility
 Georgi Kipiani (born 1978), Georgian footballer and coach
 Nikolai Kipiani (born 1997), Russian footballer
 Tornike Kipiani (born 1987), Georgian singer
 Vakhtang Kipiani (born 1971), Ukrainian opinion journalist and historian

Georgian-language surnames